In mathematics, the representation theory of the symmetric group is a particular case of the representation theory of finite groups, for which a concrete and detailed theory can be obtained. This has a large area of potential applications, from symmetric function theory to quantum chemistry studies of atoms, molecules and solids.

The symmetric group Sn has order n!. Its conjugacy classes are labeled by partitions of n. Therefore according to the representation theory of a finite group, the number of inequivalent irreducible representations, over the complex numbers, is equal to the number of partitions of n. Unlike the general situation for finite groups, there is in fact a natural way to parametrize irreducible representations by the same set that parametrizes conjugacy classes, namely by partitions of n or equivalently Young diagrams of size n.

Each such irreducible representation can in fact be realized over the integers (every permutation acting by a matrix with integer coefficients); it can be explicitly constructed by computing the Young symmetrizers acting on a space generated by the Young tableaux of shape given by the Young diagram. The dimension  of the representation that corresponds to the Young diagram  is given by the hook length formula.

To each irreducible representation ρ we can associate an irreducible character, χρ.
To compute χρ(π) where π is a permutation, one can use the combinatorial Murnaghan–Nakayama rule
. Note that χρ is constant on conjugacy classes,
that is, χρ(π) = χρ(σ−1πσ) for all permutations σ.

Over other fields the situation can become much more complicated.  If the field K has characteristic equal to zero or greater than n then by Maschke's theorem the group algebra KSn is semisimple. In these cases the irreducible representations defined over the integers give the complete set of irreducible representations (after reduction modulo the characteristic if necessary).

However, the irreducible representations of the symmetric group are not known in arbitrary characteristic. In this context it is more usual to use the language of modules rather than representations. The representation obtained from an irreducible representation defined over the integers by reducing modulo the characteristic will not in general be irreducible. The modules so constructed are called Specht modules, and every irreducible does arise inside some such module. There are now fewer irreducibles, and although they can be classified they are very poorly understood. For example, even their dimensions are not known in general.

The determination of the irreducible modules for the symmetric group over an arbitrary field is widely regarded as one of the most important open problems in representation theory.

Low-dimensional representations

Symmetric groups 
The lowest-dimensional representations of the symmetric groups can be described explicitly, and over arbitrary fields. The smallest two degrees in characteristic zero are described here:

Every symmetric group has a one-dimensional representation called the trivial representation, where every element acts as the one by one identity matrix.  For , there is another irreducible representation of degree 1, called the sign representation or alternating character, which takes a permutation to the one by one matrix with entry ±1 based on the sign of the permutation.  These are the only one-dimensional representations of the symmetric groups, as one-dimensional representations are abelian, and the abelianization of the symmetric group is C2, the cyclic group of order 2.

This has the trivial subrepresentation consisting of vectors whose coordinates are all equal. The orthogonal complement consists of those vectors whose coordinates sum to zero, and when , the representation on this subspace is an -dimensional irreducible representation, called the standard representation. Another -dimensional irreducible representation is found by tensoring with the sign representation. An exterior power  of the standard representation  is irreducible provided  .

For , these are the lowest-dimensional irreducible representations of Sn – all other irreducible representations have dimension at least n. For , the exceptional transitive embedding of S5 into S6 produces another pair of five-dimensional irreducible representations.

Alternating groups 

The representation theory of the alternating groups is similar, though the sign representation disappears. For , the lowest-dimensional irreducible representations are the trivial representation in dimension one, and the -dimensional representation from the other summand of the permutation representation, with all other irreducible representations having higher dimension, but there are exceptions for smaller n.

The alternating groups for  have only one one-dimensional irreducible representation, the trivial representation.

 For , there is just one irreducible representation of degree , and this is the smallest degree of a non-trivial irreducible representation.
 For , there is just one  irreducible representation, but there are the exceptional irreducible representations of dimension 1.
 For , there are two dual irreducible representations of dimension 3, corresponding to its action as icosahedral symmetry.
 For , there is an extra irreducible representation of dimension 5 corresponding to the exceptional transitive embedding of A5 in A6.

Tensor products of representations

Kronecker coefficients

The coefficients  are called the Kronecker coefficients of the symmetric group.
They can be computed from the characters of the representations :

The values of the characters  can be computed using the Frobenius formula. The coefficients  are

A few examples, written in terms of Young diagrams :

where the depth  of a Young diagram is the number of boxes that do not belong to the first row.

Reduced Kronecker coefficients

is called a reduced Kronecker coefficient or stable Kronecker coefficient. There are known bounds on the value of  where  reaches its limit.

In contrast to Kronecker coefficients, reduced Kronecker coefficients are defined for any triple of Young diagrams, not necessarily of the same size. If , then  coincides with the Littlewood-Richardson coefficient . Reduced Kronecker coefficients can be written as linear combinations of Littlewood-Richardson coefficients via a change of bases in the space of symmetric functions, giving rise to expressions that are manifestly integral although not manifestly positive. Reduced Kronecker coefficients can also be written in terms of Kronecker and Littlewood-Richardson coefficients   via Littlewood's formula

Conversely, it is possible to recover the Kronecker coefficients as linear combinations of reduced Kronecker coefficients.

Reduced Kronecker coefficients are implemented in the computer algebra system SageMath.

Eigenvalues of complex representations

There is a combinatorial description of the cyclic exponents of the symmetric group (and wreath products thereof).
Then the cyclic exponents of the representation of  described by the Young diagram  are the -indices of the corresponding Young tableaux. 

See also
Alternating polynomials
Symmetric polynomials
Schur functor
Robinson–Schensted correspondence
Schur–Weyl duality
Jucys–Murphy element
Garnir relations

References

Cited Publications
 
 
 
 

Representation theory of finite groups
Permutations
Integer partitions